Baghdad Jewish Arabic or autonym  (Jewish Speech) or  (our speech) is the Arabic dialect spoken by the Jews of Baghdad and other towns of Southern Iraq. This dialect differs from the dialect spoken by the Jews in Northern Iraq, such as Mosul and 'Ana.  The Baghdadi and Northern dialects may be regarded as subvarieties of Judeo-Iraqi Arabic. As with most Judeo-Arab communities, there are likely to be few, if any, speakers of the Judeo-Iraqi Arabic dialects who still reside within Iraq. Rather these dialects have been maintained or are facing critical endangerment within respective Judeo-Iraqi diasporas, namely those of Israel and the United States. In 2014, the film Farewell Baghdad (Arabic: مطير الحمام; Hebrew: מפריח היונים, lit. "The Dove Flyer"), which is performed mostly in Jewish Baghdadi Arabic dialect, became the first film to be almost completely performed in Judeo-Iraqi Arabic.

Classification
Baghdad Jewish Arabic (and Baghdadi Christian Arabic) resemble the dialect of Northern Iraq, and more distantly that of Syria, rather than the Baghdad Arabic spoken by the Muslims.  The Muslim dialect is classified as a gilit dialect (from their pronunciation of the Arabic word for "I said") while the others are qeltu dialects. Another resemblance between Baghdad Jewish Arabic and North Mesopotamian Arabic is the pronunciation of ra as a uvular.  This peculiarity goes back centuries: in medieval Iraqi Judaeo-Arabic manuscripts the letters ra and ghayn are frequently interchanged. It is thought that the qeltu dialects represent the older Arabic dialect of Mesopotamia while the gilit dialect is of Bedouin origin.  Another factor may be the northern origins of the Jewish community of Baghdad after 1258 (see below under History).  Like Northern Mesopotamian and Syrian Arabic, Jewish Baghdadi Arabic shows some signs of an Aramaic substrate.  Violette Shamosh records that, at the Passover Seder, she could understand some of the passages in Aramaic but none of the passages in Hebrew.

History
The Mongol invasion wiped out most of the inhabitants of Mesopotamia. Later, the original qeltu Baghdadi dialect became extinct as a result of massive Bedouin immigrations to Lower Mesopotamia and was replaced by the Bedouin influenced gilit dialect. The Jews of Baghdad are a largely indigenous population and they also preserve the pre-Mongol invasion dialect of Baghdad in its Jewish form, which is similar but a bit different from the general pre-Mongol Baghdadi dialect due to the linguistic influences of Hebrew and Judeo-Babylonian Aramaic, instead of the general Babylonian Aramaic that existed before the Islamic invasion.

As with other respective religious and ethnic communities coexisting in Baghdad, the Jewish community had almost exclusively spoken as well as written in their distinctive dialect, largely drawing their linguistic influences from Hebrew and Judeo-Aramaic and even non-linguistic influences from languages such as Sumerian, Akkadian, Persian and Turkish. Simultaneous fluency and literacy in the Arabic used by the dominant Muslim communities had also been commonplace.

With waves of persecution and thus emigration, the dialect has been carried to and until recently used within respective Judeo-Iraqi diaspora communities, spanning Bombay, Calcutta, Singapore, Hong Kong, Manchester and numerous other international urban hubs. After the mass emigration of Jews from Iraq to Israel between the 1940s and 1960s, Israel came to hold the single largest linguistic community of Judeo-Iraqi Arabic speakers. With successive generations being born and raised in Israel, it is mainly the older people who still actively or passively speak Judeo-Baghdadi and other forms of Judeo-Iraqi Arabic. Israelis of Iraqi descent in turn are largely unilingual Israeli Hebrew speakers.

Orthography
The Jews of Baghdad also have a written Judeo-Arabic that differs from the spoken language and uses Hebrew characters.  There is a sizeable published religious literature in the language, including several Bible translations and the Qanūn an-nisā''' ( of the hakham Yosef Hayyim.

The following method of describing the letters of the Hebrew alphabet was used by teachers in Baghdad until quite recently:

Phonology
Consonants

JB is relatively conservative in preserving Classical Arabic phonemes. Classical Arabic interdental  are preserved, like in Muslim Baghdadi Arabic (Christian Baghdadi Arabic merges them into ).  has merged into .

(an oath)' vs. wálla 'he went away', ḅāḅa 'father, dad' vs. bāba 'her door'). In other words, there are velarized segments which cannot be demonstrated to be phonemic, but which cannot be substituted, e.g. ṃāṃa 'mother, mummy'. There is a certain degree of velarization harmony.

 is one of the primary distinguishing features of Jewish (as opposed to Muslim, but not Christian) Baghdadi Arabic. However  has been re-introduced in non-Arabic loans (e.g. brāxa 'blessing' < Heb. ברכה, qūri 'teapot' < Pers. qūrī). Modern loan words from other Arabic dialects also have this sound; this sometimes leads to cases where the same word may have two forms depending on context, e.g. ʿáskaġ 'army' vs. ḥākəm ʿáskari 'martial law'. There are many instances where this alternation leads to a subtle change in meaning, e.g. faġġ 'he poured, served foot' vs. farr 'he threw'.

The consonants  were originally of foreign origin, but have pervaded the language to the extent that native speakers do not perceive or even realize their non-native origin.

Vowels

Suprasegmentals
Stress is usually on the ultimate or penultimate syllable, but sometimes on the antipenultimate (mostly in loans or compound words).

Grammar

Verbs

See also
Judeo-Iraqi Arabic
Iraqi Arabic
Baghdad Arabic
Judeo-Arabic languages
Baghdadi Jews
History of the Jews in Iraq

 Notes 

 References 
 Citations 

 Sources 

 Blanc, Haim. Communal Dialects in Baghdad: Harvard 1964.
 Kees Versteegh, et al. Encyclopedia of Arabic Language and Linguistics: Brill 2006.
 Mansour, Jacob. The Jewish Baghdadi Dialect: Studies and Texts in the Judaeo-Arabic Dialect of Baghdad'': The Babylonian Jewry Heritage Centre 1991.

External links
Jewish Baghdadi recordings
Baghdadi Jewish Arabic-Hebrew dictionary  (In Hebrew)

Jewish Iraqi history
Judeo-Arabic languages
North Mesopotamian Arabic
Languages of Iraq
Jews and Judaism in Baghdad